Paris High School  may refer to:

In Canada:
Paris District High School, Paris, Ontario

In the United States:
Paris High School (Arkansas), Paris, Arkansas
Paris High School (Paris, Illinois), Paris, Illinois
Paris High School (Kentucky), Paris, Kentucky
Paris High School (Missouri), Paris, Missouri
Paris High School (Texas), Paris, Texas